Marloes de Boer (born 30 January 1982) is a former Dutch football defender. Throughout her career she played for Oranje Nassau, Be Quick '28 and FC Twente in the Dutch league. She retired in 2011, after winning the league with Twente. 

She played for the Dutch national team, making her debut against Czech Republic on 14 June 2001 and played a total of 60 matches including her last appearance against England on 6 September 2009 at the semifinal match of the 2009 European Championship.

International goals
Scores and results list the Netherlands goal tally first.

Honours
 Dutch league (1): 2010–11
 Dutch cup (2): 2005, 2008

References

1982 births
Living people
Dutch women's footballers
Netherlands women's international footballers
People from Den Ham
FC Twente (women) players
Eredivisie (women) players
Be Quick '28 players
Women's association football defenders
Footballers from Overijssel